Alwar (Pronunciation: [əlʋəɾ]) is a city located in India's National Capital Region and the administrative headquarters of Alwar District in the state of Rajasthan. It is located 150 km south of Delhi and 150 km north of Jaipur. At present the district is famous for production of Mustard Crop in the region, manufacturing of Ray Ban eyeglasses, Beer production plants and frozen food industry.

Etymology 
There are many theories about the derivation of the name Alwar. Cunningham holds that the city derived its name from the Salva tribe and was originally Salwapur, then Salwar, Halawar and eventually Alwar, According to another school it was known as Aravalpur or the city of Aravali. Some others hold that city is named after Alaval Khan Mewati (Khanzada prince who wrested Alwar from Nikumbh Rajputs). A research conducted during the reign of Maharaja Jai Singh of Alwar revealed that Maharaja Alaghraj, second son of Maharaja Kakil of Amber. ruled the area in the eleventh century and his territory extended up to the present city of Alwar. He founded the city of Alpur in 1106 Vikrami Samvat (1049 A.D.) after his own name which eventually became Alwar. It was formerly spelt as Ulwar but in the reign of Jai Singh the spelling was changed to Alwar.

History

Ancient history
The ancient name of Alwar is Salva or Salwa (tribe).Alwar was a part of the Matsya Kingdom, one of the 16 ancient Mahājanapadas. In late Vedic texts (such as the Jaiminiya Brahmana), the Salva or Salvi tribe is described as a non-Vedic tribe that occupied Kurukshetra and conquered the Kuru Kingdom

The Salvas 
The Salvas settled along the Yamuna river and the Alwar province of Rajasthan after attacking the Kuru kingdom, and they later accepted Vedic culture by the end of the Vedic era as they converged with the remaining Kurus and the Surasena mahajanapada, near Matsya kingdom.

Medieval history 
From time to time, a different Rajput sub-clan came to rule Alwar. Examples include the Nikumbh, the Khanzada Rajputs, the Badgujar Rajput, and finally the Naruka Rajputs who took the control over this area. The Maratha Empire also ruled this region for a short period. Rao Raja Pratap Singh Naruka, took the Alwar Fort (among other) from the Jat Raja of Bharatpur and laid down the foundation for modern day Alwar.

Hemchandra Vikramaditya (Hemu), born in Machari, Rajgarh, a village in Alwar, was a Hindu emperor of North India during the 16th century. This was a period when the Mughals and Afghans were vying for power in the region. Hemu captured Delhi on 7 October 1556 after defeating the Mughal forces in the Battle of Delhi in the Tughlaqabad area in Delhi, and became the de facto emperor. He won twenty-two battles in succession and became the last Hindu emperor of Delhi. In 1556, after his defeat in the Second Battle of Panipat, he was executed and Mughal regime was restored in North India.

Colonial era

Alwar State, a princely state established in 1770, was established by a Kachwaha Rajput named Pratap Singh Naruka who was earlier a jagirdar of "Dhai Gaon" (two-and-a-half villages) near Machari. His successor Bakhtawar Singh Naruka was defeated after launching an armed incursion into neighbouring Jaipur State (ruled by their Kachwaha seniors, erstwhile overlords of his predecessor) and being forced to accept the consequent treaty mediated by East India Company prohibiting him from political relations with other states without the consent of the colonial British. According to the "Gazetteer of Ulwar" published by the British raj, Alwar State was subdivided into four regions:
 Rath region: current Behror and Neemrana, was ruled by Lah Chauhan Rajput zamindar who had descended from Prithviraj Chauhan. Sahesh Mal was a son of Raja Sangat Singh Chauhan. Sangat was the great-grandson of Chahir Deo Chauhan, brother of famous king Prithviraj Chauhan. In accordance with the pledge by the Raja Sangat Singh Chauhan to his younger queen for marrying her in his old age, her two sons from him were bestowed the Rath area and its headquarter of Mandhan near Neemrana. King Sangat Singh Chauhan's 19 sons from the older queen set out to seek their fortunes. Of the 19 brothers, Harsh Dev Chauhan and Sahesh Mal Chauhan arrived in the Gurgaon district.  Lah Chauhan, the ruler of Rath, was a son of raja Sangat Singh Chauhan by the younger Rani whose two sons became inheritors of Raja Sangat Singh's territory of Rath with its headquarter at Mandhan when other 19 sons from the other wives were required to quit the kingdom as per the promise of Raja Sangat.

  Wai region: current Bansur and Thana Ghazi, was ruled by Shekhawat rajput zamindars.
  Narukhand region: current Rajgarh and Laxmangarh, was ruled by Naruka clan of Rajputs same as that of the ruling kings of the Alwar State
  Mewat region: current Palwal and Nuh districts, had the highest population of the Meo Muslims.

Post-independence

Alwar acceded to the dominion of India following the independence of India in 1947. On 18 March 1948, the state merged with three neighbouring princely states (Bharatpur, Dholpur and Karauli) to form the Matsya Union. On 15 May 1949, it was united with neighbouring princely states and the territory of Ajmer to form the present-day Indian state of Rajasthan. Alwar was designated as part of the National Capital Region, resulting in additional development projects including rapid-rail to Delhi and drinking water improvements. The military cantonment of Itarana lies on the outskirts of Alwar.

Tourist attractions

Fairy Queen 

The Fairy Queen, a national treasure (cultural artifact) of India and the world's oldest working locomotive engine (c. 1855 CE), operates as a tourist luxury train between Delhi and Alwar.

Bala Qila 
Bala Qila (lit. "High Fort"), also known as Alwar Fort, is a fort approximately 300 meters above the city, founded by the 15th-century Khanzada Rajput ruler Hasan Khan Mewati and built on the foundations of a 10th-century mud fort. Situated on the Aravalli Range, the fort is 5 kilometres long and about 1.5 kilometres wide with turrets, a large gate, a temple, and a residential area.

City Palace 
The City Palace, also known as Vinay Vilas Mahal, built in 1793 CE by Raja Bakhtawar Singh, blends the Rajputana and Islamic architectural styles and has marble pavilions on lotus-shaped bases in its courtyard. The palace houses a state museum with a collection of manuscripts, including one depicting Emperor Babur’s life, Ragamala paintings and miniatures, and historic swords that once belonged to Muhammad Ghori, Emperor Akbar and Aurangzeb; and a golden Durbar hall. This palace that once belonged to the Maharaja (lit. Great Ruler) has now been converted into a District Administrative office also housing the District Court.

Sariska Tiger Reserve

The Sariska Tiger Reserve, a National Park and Tiger Reserve, is located in the Aravali hills only a few kilometres away from Alwar. Declared a Wildlife reserve in 1955 and a National Park in 1982, it is the first reserve in the world to have successfully relocated tigers. The sanctuary, which became a part of India's Project Tiger in 1978, also preserves other species including rare birds and plants.

Bhangarh Fort

Bhangarh Fort, branded as the fourth most haunted palace in the world, and the most haunted palace in Asia, is a 17th-century fort built by Bhagwant Das for his younger son Madho Singh I. The fort, a monument protected by the Archaeological Survey of India and is known for its association to legends and paranormal activities, is a tourist attraction for visitors across the world.

Siliserh Lake 

Siliserh Lake is 19th century lake created by Maharaja Vijay Singh of Alwar, situated 8 miles southwest of Alwar.

Hill Fort Kesroli 

Hill Fort Kesroli, a 14th-century fort, has now been converted into and is conserved as a heritage hotel.

Transport 

As of 2019, the most common modes of medium-distance transport in Alwar are government-owned services such as railways and buses, as well as privately operated lok pariwahan buses, taxis and auto rickshaws. Bus services operate from the Alwar old Bus Station which is 5 km away from the Alwar railway junction. In addition to this it is also planned that a metro rail system from Delhi to Alwar via Behror route will be started. The nearest airports to Alwar are Indira Gandhi International Airport in Delhi (143 km away), Jaipur International Airport (150 km away), and an airport currently under development in Bhiwadi airport (90 km away). Alwar Junction railway station, on the Delhi–Jaipur line, is connected with Delhi, Jaipur, and Mumbai. Alwar is connected by roads from major cities of Rajasthan and nearby states.

Geography
The Ruparail River is a major river near the city. Alwar is fairly rich in mineral wealth; it produces marble, granite, feldspar, dolomite, quartz, limestone, soap stone, barites, copper clay, copper ore and pyrophylite.

Climate 
Alwar has a monsoon-influenced hot semi-arid climate (Köppen climate classification BSh) with long, extremely hot summers and short, mild to warm winters.The climate here is considered to be a local steppe climate. Alwar experiences a short monsoon. The average annual rainfall is about 67 cm  which mostly falls in July & August due to monsoon. It had record of highest temperature ever recorded of India till 2016, when a town Phalodi in Jodhpur district of Rajasthan recorded  on 19 May 2016.

Demographics

At the time of the 2011 census, the population of Alwar city and Alwar district were 341,422 and 3,674,179 respectively, with Hindus representing 90.7% of the population, Muslims representing 4.3%, Sikhs representing 2.6%, Jains representing 2.1%, and the remaining 1.3% belonging to other religions.

Education

Raj Rishi Bhartrihari Matsya University was established in 2012–13 . Alwar has several schools such as Alwar Public School, Shri Oswal Jain Senior Secondary School, St. Anselm's Senior Secondary School, Kendriya Vidyalaya, Adinath Public School, Knowledge City School, Chinar Public School, Lords International School, Sri Guru Harkrishan Public School, Step By Step Senior Secondary School, Raath International School, National Academy and Silver Oak, and colleges (Raj Rishi college, Siddhi Vinayak College, Presidency College, Government Law College, KCRI College, IET College). The Employee's State Insurance Corporation (ESIC) Medical College is constructed with a whooping INR 800 crore budget and started operating from 2017.

Notable people

Saurabh Singh Shekhawat
Sakshi Tanwar
Jitendra Kumar
Imran Khan
Aastha Chaudhary
Bhuvneshwari Kumari
Mahesh Sharma
Jitendra Singh

References

Bibliography

External links

 
 History of District Alwar

Alwar
Cities and towns in Alwar district